Chibi, also known as super deformation, or S.D. is a style of caricature originating in Japan, and common in anime and manga where characters are drawn in an exaggerated way, typically small and chubby with stubby limbs, oversized heads, and minimal detail. The style has found its way into the anime and manga fandom through its usage in manga works.

Word usage and Etymology

"Super deformed" and "S.D." come from Japanese , itself from French .

Proportions and Appearance

Compared to the average anime character, usually about seven to eight heads tall, the head of a super-deformed character is normally anywhere between one third and one half the character's height. In addition to their modified proportions, super-deformed characters typically lack the detail of their normal counterparts. As a result, when a character of average proportions is depicted as a super-deformed character, certain aspects of his or her design will be simplified and others will be grossly exaggerated. Details such as folds on a jacket are ignored, and general shapes are favored. If a character has a signature characteristic (odd hair, a particular accessory, etc.) this will typically be prominent in the super deformed version of the character.

Media usage
One example of chibi's usage in Japanese, which brought the term to the attention of Western fans, is Chibiusa; this diminutive pet name for the daughter of Sailor Moon comes from Chibi Usagi ('Little Rabbit'). The chibi art style is part of Japanese culture, and is seen everywhere from advertising and subway signs to anime and manga. The style was popularized by franchises like Dragon Ball and SD Gundam in the 1980s. It is used as comic relief in anime and manga, giving additional emphasis to a character's emotional reaction.

The super deformed style has also appeared in anime-influenced American series such as Homestuck, Teen Titans, and Avatar: The Last Airbender, which feature super deformed shorts.

In 2022 the Disney Channel introduced the Disney Chibiverse, program shorts, that uses dozens of Disney animated characters.

See also
Kawaii, 'cute'
Moe (slang), expression of fascination or infatuation

References

Anime and manga terminology
Articles containing video clips
Caricature
Japanese culture
Japanese popular culture
Japanese words and phrases

External links
 Tofugu article covering native usage of the word "chibi", as well as the chibi style
 Detailed tutorial for drawing in the chibi style